Birth of a Beauty is a 2014 South Korean television series starring Joo Sang-wook, Han Ye-seul, Jung Gyu-woon and Wang Ji-hye. It aired on SBS from November 1, 2014 to January 11, 2015 for 21 episodes.

Adaptation
Story of this Drama is an adapted from 1983 Drama series from Australia  titled Return to Eden & adapted from 1988 Hindi movie from India titled  Khoon Bhari Maang.

Plot 
Overweight, kind-hearted Sa Geum-ran (Ha Jae-sook) married into a well-to-do family, but her husband Lee Kang-joon (Jung Gyu-woon) has spent the past seven years in the United States for his business, and Sa Geum-ran has lived with her mother-in-law and sisters-in-law who treats her badly. Geum-ran learns that Kang-joon has returned home without telling her, not only that but has been having a secret affair with the sophisticated broadcast announcer Gyo Chae-yeon (Wang Ji-hye), and to worsen that as soon as Kang-joon tells her of his affair he asked for a divorce. When Geum-ran sees her in-laws welcoming Chae-yeon with open arms, the distraught Geum-ran threatens her husband. Devastated, she drove with tears, as it started to pour the road had become slippery and was hard to see, she later on was hit by a car and crashed off a cliff. Everyone assumed that Geum-ran was dead and attends her funeral, not knowing that she's still alive watching them, as she stayed and watched not even her husband or his family came. To get revenge against those who've wronged and betrayed her, Geum-ran begs Han Tae-hee (Joo Sang-wook), who she thought was the plastic surgeon of an extreme-makeover television show Change, to transform her, and he reluctantly agrees because of his own ulterior motives. After weight loss and surgery, Geum-ran emerges from the full-body makeover as a stunningly beautiful woman, and she begins calling herself with a new name Sara (Han Ye-seul), albeit retaining her coarse ajumma personality. With Tae-hee as her life coach, they scheme to ruin Kang-joon and Chae-yeon's upcoming wedding in three weeks. But as Sara interacts with Kang-joon in their staged run-ins, old feelings resurface, and she decides that instead of destroying him, she wants her husband back. What would happen next as they proceed in their plot but soon learned of a scary conspiracy made by Kang-joon and Chae-yeon for trying to cause Geum-ran's death. Geum-ran survived &  her feelings changed towards her ex-husband and how would love stir between her and Tae-hee?

Cast

Main characters
Joo Sang-wook as Han Tae-hee
Han Ye-seul as Sara/Sa Geum-ran/Kim Duk-sun
Jung Gyu-woon as Lee Kang-joon 
Wang Ji-hye as Gyo Chae-yeon

Supporting characters
Ha Jae-sook as Sa Geum-ran
Han Sang-jin as Han Min-hyeok
In Gyo-jin as Gyo Ji-hoon
Han Jin-hee as Lee Jung-sik
Kim Young-ae as Go Soon-dong
Kang Kyung-heon as Lee Jin-young
Jin Ye-sol as Lee Min-young
Kwon Hwa-woon as Team leader Choi
Kim Yong-rim as Mrs. Park
Shim Yi-young as  Eun Kyung-joo
Kim Chung as Son Ji-sook
Lee Jong-nam as Shim Yeo-ok
Kim Young-ok as Shin Hui-ja, Kang-joon's grandmother

Awards and nominations

References

External links
 

2014 South Korean television series debuts
2015 South Korean television series endings
Seoul Broadcasting System television dramas
Korean-language television shows
South Korean romantic comedy television series